Desportes is a French surname. Notable people with the surname include:

Alexandre-François Desportes (1661–1743), French painter
Émile Desportes (1878–1944), French classical composer and conductor
Hélène Desportes (1620–1675)
Narcisse Henri François Desportes (1776–1856), French botanist and bibliographer
Nicolas Desportes (1718–1787), French painter
Philippe Desportes (1546–1606), French poet
Vincent Desportes (born 1953), French general and military theorist
Yvonne Desportes (1907–1993), French classical composer, writer and music educator

French-language surnames